Scaevola muluensis is a species of plant in the family Goodeniaceae. It is endemic to Borneo where it is confined to Sarawak.
This plant was first described in 1993 by the botanist Khoon Meng Wong in the journal Sandakania.

References

muluensis
Endemic flora of Borneo
Flora of Sarawak
Vulnerable plants
Taxonomy articles created by Polbot
Plants described in 1993